I tabù n. 2 (also released as Macabro) is a 1965 Italian documentary film directed by Romolo Marcellini.

External links
 

1965 films
1960s Italian-language films
Italian documentary films
1965 documentary films
Films directed by Romolo Marcellini
Mondo films
1960s Italian films